Hinduism is a majority religion in Odisha, which is followed by nearly 93% of the total population of the state. Odisha has a very rich cultural heritage of Hinduism and the state has second highest percentage of Hindus, after Himachal Pradesh. The state is home for the tribal culture and historical Hindu temple, the notable includes the Jagannath Temple in Puri and Lingaraja Temple. Ratha Yatra of Puri is one of the biggest Hindu pilgrimage in India. The state has also many Historical sites.

Demographics 
Majority of population of Odisha follows Hinduism, which is about 93.6% of the total population. Many of the tribal people follows their traditional tribal religions.

Hindus decadal population

Hindu population by district

Temples 

Temple architecture in Odisha architecture has assumed a unique identity and evolved into the rock-cutting and wooden carved style which is also a very common style of Hindu temples in Andhra Pradesh and Telangana. In the older times in Odisha's history, the rulers used temples as symbol of respect to gods and their prosperity and hence gave special focus for the best style of Hindu temple architecture.

References

External links 

 
  at Odisha Tourism

Hinduism in Odisha